Batei Ungarin (lit. Hungarian Houses) is a Haredi Jewish neighborhood in Jerusalem, north-east of the Old City of Jerusalem.  It was built by Kolel Ungarin,  a Hungarian Jewish charity supporting Jews living in the Land of Israel.

History
Batei Ungarin was established in 1891 by immigrant Hungarian Jews. By World War I, there were 100-200  homes (350 by 1948), a synagogue, a beit midrash, and a mikveh. The original inhabitants of the neighborhood came from Hungary, and many of the residents who live there today can trace their lineage to Hungary. A major Hasidic group called Toldos Aharon has its headquarters on the edge of Batei Ungarin.

References

See also
 Expansion of Jerusalem in the 19th century

Neighbourhoods of Jerusalem
Orthodox Jewish communities in Jerusalem
Hungarian-Jewish culture in Israel